Khlong Maha Nak is one of five khwaengs (subdistricts) of Pom Prap Sattru Phai District, Bangkok.

Naming
It is named after the Khlong Maha Nak canal that flows through and bisects the area.

Geography
Roads neighboring this subdistrict include (from the north clockwise): Lan Luang, Worachak, Bamrung Mueang, Krung Kasem.

Khlong Maha Nak, Khlong Phadung Krung Kasem, and Khlong Saen Saep are main watercourses. The Khlong Phadung Krung Kasem canal serves as the boundary between Si Yaek Maha Nak Subdistrict, Dusit District, and  Rong Mueang Subdistrict, Pathum  Wan District.

Population
Total population of 9,482 people (4,473 men, and  5,009 women) most of the people are Muslims live in Masjid Maha Nak's neighbourhood  by the Khlong Maha Nak.

Places
Hua Chiew Hospital
Thonburi Bamrungmuang Hospital
Masjid Maha Nak
Bobae Market
Bobae Tower
Prince Palace Hotel
 Ministry of Social Development and Human Security
Wat Sitaram
Varadis Palace

References

Subdistricts of Bangkok
Pom Prap Sattru Phai district